Jasmin Christian Blanchette is a computer scientist working as a professor of theoretical computer science at the Ludwig Maximilian University of Munich.

Education 
Blanchette earned a Bachelor of Science degree in computer science from the Université de Sherbrooke, a Master of Science in computer science from the University of Oslo, and a PhD in computer science from the Technical University of Munich.

Career 
Blanchette is the editor-in-chief of the Journal of Automated Reasoning. He is also a guest researcher at the University of Lorraine and the Max Planck Institute for Informatics. He was previously an associate professor at the Vrije Universiteit Amsterdam and a software engineer and documentation manager for Trolltech (now The Qt Company).

References 

Technical University of Munich alumni
Academic staff of the University of Lorraine
Academic staff of the Ludwig Maximilian University of Munich
Academic staff of Bundeswehr University Munich
Université de Sherbrooke alumni
University of Oslo alumni